In the United Kingdom the Commonhold and Leasehold Reform Act 2002 provides a right for leaseholders to change the appointment of the management of their building to another provider, by setting up a special company to take over from the freeholder those rights of appointment of management of the building.

One right to manage company per block/Triplerose Ltd v 90 Broomfield Road RTM Co Ltd

In March 2015 the Court of Appeal found in favour of Triplerose Ltd (freeholder) against 90 Broomfield Road (residents/lessees) in what was a landmark case. The court ruled:

The result of this ruling is that no right-to-manage company can apply to manage multiple blocks on an estate.

The right relates to a building, so, in an estate of separate blocks, each block would need to qualify separately and an individual RTM notice served. In the case of an estate of flats under the same management, it would be sensible to take over the management of the whole estate, but this would have to be accomplished by application in respect of each separate block.

The duty to transfer funds
The legal obligation of the freeholder or previous management company is to pass forward any unspent funds.  In practice, if these are less than £2,000, it may not be economic to pursue them through the courts, but ultimate determination can be made by a leasehold valuation tribunal.

Freeholder's membership of the right-to-manage company
Immediately upon the RTM company taking over on the acquisition date, the landlord (freeholder) becomes entitled to membership of the company, with full voting rights as a company member (if they wish to take it up). The landlord's votes are, in the first instance, determined according to the units they hold in the building, flats or non-residential parts. In cases where they hold no units, and therefore would have no votes, they are allocated one vote as the landlord.

As the right to manage is not default-based, there is no reason why the landlord, who retains an interest in the building, should not have some input to the practicalities of its management. It is different where the manager has been appointed by a tribunal to replace a poor or incompetent manager – there the landlord is removed entirely as a consequence of his mismanagement. With the right to manage, it is assumed that the landlord is not necessarily at fault and so there is no justification for his exclusion from the management process.

References

Law of the United Kingdom
Real estate in the United Kingdom
Real property law